Albert John Young "Bert" Hopkins (3 May 1874 – 25 April 1931) was an Australian cricketer and Penrith bee-farmer who played in 20 Tests between 1902 and 1909. An all-rounder, Hopkins was a competent bowler and batsman in Australian domestic cricket for New South Wales, however he was less frequently called on to bowl in Test matches: he was not asked to bowl in a quarter of his appearances.

In the second Test at Lord's in 1902 under captain Joe Darling, Hopkins opened the bowling for Australia with Ernie Jones. Hopkins took the first two wickets of the English team, the famed batsmen C. B. Fry and Ranjitsinhji, both for ducks. These were the only two wickets that fell in the match, which was abandoned not long afterwards owing to persistent rain. He was also a strong fielder.

He worked in the Probate Office of New South Wales for more than 25 years. He died in hospital in April 1931 after a short illness, 8 days before his 57th birthday.

See also
 List of New South Wales representative cricketers

References

External links
 

1874 births
1931 deaths
Australia Test cricketers
New South Wales cricketers
People from Young, New South Wales
Australian cricketers
Cricketers from New South Wales